The Shire of Delatite was a local government area in Victoria, Australia, located in the north-east part of the state. It included the towns of Benalla and Mansfield, and was formed in 1994 from the amalgamation of the City of Benalla, Shire of Benalla, the then Shire of Mansfield and part of the Shire of Violet Town. In 2002 the shire was split into the Rural City of Benalla and Shire of Mansfield. This process has been cited as an example of successful de-amalgamation by residents of other councils who are unhappy with the forced mergers that affected almost all Victorian local government areas in 1994.

The Delatite Shire Council had its seat of local government and administrative centre in Benalla, with a service centre located in Mansfield. The Shire was named after the county of Delatite, most of which was included in the shire.

References

External links
Australian Places - Delatite

Delatite